Jean-Baptiste de Glandevès du Castellet  (Castellet-Saint-Cassien, 7 November 1728 — 1803 ) was a French Navy officer. He served in the War of American Independence.

Biography 
Glandevès was born to the family of Marie Hiéronyme de Bruny and of Charles François de Glandevès du Castellet. He was cousin to Pierre-André de Glandevès du Castellet, and uncle to Pierre de Moriès-Castellet.

Glandevès joined the Navy as a Garde-Marine in July 1741. He served on the 64-gun Solide, on which he took part in the Battle of Cape Sicié on 22 February 1744. In 1746, he was on Trident before transferring to Argonaute and taking part in Duc d'Anville expedition.

He was promoted to Lieutenant in 1756. That year, during the Seven Years' War, he served on the 64-gun Achille, which was part of the squadron under La Galissonière. He took part in the Battle of Minorca on 20 May 1756. He was wounded on the 80-gun Océan at the Battle of Lagos on 18–19 August 1759.

Glandevès was promoted to Captain in 1772. In 1774, he was given command of the frigate Atalante. In 1777, he transferred to the 64-gun Lion, and later he was appointed to the 74-gun Souverain.

On Souverain, Glandevès took part in the Battle of Martinique on 17 April 1780, in the Battle of the Chesapeake on 5 September 1781, and at the Battle of the Saintes on 12 April 1782. In 1782, he was promoted to Brigadier, and to Chef d'escadre in on 20 August 1784.

He was the officer in charge of the Navy at Toulon from 1790 to 1791, and was brutalised by a mob during the revolutionary unrest. In 1792, he was promoted to Contre-amiral.

Glandevès was a Commander in the Order of Saint Louis, and a Knight of the Order of Malta.

Legacy 
Ségur mentioned Glandevès in his Mémoires as "An officer respectable because of his age, his skills and bravery. his sophisticated intelligence, his gentle piety, and his calm and kindly character made him like equally from his superiors, his equals and his subordinates."

Sources and references 
 Notes

Citations

References
 

 

 

External links
 

French Navy officers
French military personnel of the American Revolutionary War